Mido Cafe is a cha chaan teng and bing sutt located No. 63 Temple Street, at the corner of Public Square Street, in Yau Ma Tei, Kowloon, Hong Kong.

Mido Cafe was established in 1950. It occupies the ground and first floor of a four-storey concrete building, and has retained a number of original features, such as wood booths and floor and wall tiles of that era.

It suddenly closed on July 18, 2022 via a letter on the door. It is unknown if they will reopen as the note did not specify if this was a temporary closure or a permanent closure.

It has been featured in several films and TV shows, including The World of Suzie Wong (1960), Days of Being Wild (1990), Moonlight Express (1999), Street Fighters, Goodbye Mr. Cool (2001),  Revolving Doors of Vengeance (2005), Strangers (2018).

See also
 China Cafe

References

External links

 Review with pictures at ladyironchef.com

Restaurants in Hong Kong
Yau Ma Tei